Juan Carlos Prieto is a paralympic athlete from Spain, competing mainly in category B2 events.

Prieto competed in the 1992 Summer Paralympics in his home country of Spain. He competed in the 800m, 1500m and long jump and won a silver medal in the high jump.

References

Paralympic athletes of Spain
Athletes (track and field) at the 1992 Summer Paralympics
Paralympic silver medalists for Spain
Living people
Medalists at the 1992 Summer Paralympics
Year of birth missing (living people)
Paralympic medalists in athletics (track and field)
Spanish male middle-distance runners
Spanish male long jumpers
Spanish male high jumpers
Visually impaired middle-distance runners
Visually impaired long jumpers
Visually impaired high jumpers
Paralympic middle-distance runners
Paralympic long jumpers
Paralympic high jumpers
20th-century Spanish people